is the collective title for a series of media released in the 1990s that are based on Toei's popular Kamen Rider Series. It features super deformed versions of the various Kamen Riders featured from Kamen Rider through Black RX placed in a cartoonish world, where each enemy of the Riders has banded together under the command of the "Great Leader" under the name "Gran Shocker".

Manga
The first Kamen Rider SD manga was  written by Kei Aoki and published in Comic BonBons DX BonBon imprint. The next edition was  written by Hiroshi Katō and was published in CoroCoro Comic from January 1992 through April 1993. Takeshi Tamai's  was published in Shogakukan's family comic magazines. Minoru Nonaka's Kamen Rider SD was published in Telebi Land from October 1993 to February 1997.  by Yūji Hosoi has been published in Televi-Kun since December 1999.

Video games

Animation
January 23, 1993, saw the release of an original video animation edition of Kamen Rider SD titled . The cast was based on the characters from the Hurricane Legend manga, with the main character being Black RX (voiced in the animation by Joe Onodera).

The titular theme song was performed by TOM of Tom Cat fame and the ending theme  was performed by Hironobu Kageyama.

References

External links 
 

SD
Anime OVAs
SD
Toei Animation original video animation
Shogakukan franchises
Shōnen manga